The 1988 United States presidential election in Kansas took place on November 8, 1988. All fifty states and the District of Columbia, were part of the 1988 United States presidential election. Voters chose seven electors to the Electoral College, which selected the president and vice president.

Kansas was won by incumbent United States Vice President George H. W. Bush of Texas, who was running against Massachusetts Governor Michael Dukakis. Bush ran with Indiana Senator Dan Quayle as Vice President, and Dukakis ran with Texas Senator Lloyd Bentsen.

Kansas weighed in for this election as 2% more Republican than the national average. The presidential election of 1988 was a very partisan election for Kansas, with over 98% of the electorate voting for either the Democratic or Republican parties, and only four political parties appearing on the ballot. Voters from every county in Kansas turned out for the Republican Party, except for three, the largest example being Kansas City's Wyandotte County, which voted primarily Democratic. , this is the last time Douglas County voted for a Republican presidential candidate.

Bush won the election in Kansas with a 13-point win, although compared to most previous Republican performances in Kansas this was an underwhelming triumph due to the influence of an ongoing drought and farm crisis. The election results in Kansas are reflective of a nationwide reconsolidation of base for the Republican Party, which took place through the 1980s. Through the passage of some very controversial economic programs, spearheaded by then President Ronald Reagan (called, collectively, "Reaganomics"), the mid-to-late 1980s saw a period of economic growth and stability. The hallmark of Reaganomics was, in part, the wide-scale deregulation of corporate interests, and tax cuts for the wealthy.

Dukakis ran on a socially liberal platform, and advocated for higher economic regulation and environmental protection. Bush, contrarily, ran on a campaign of continuing the social and economic policies of former President Reagan – which gained him much support with social conservatives and people living in rural areas. Additionally, while the economic programs passed under Reagan, and furthered under Bush and Bill Clinton, may have boosted the economy for a brief period, they are criticized by many analysts as "setting the stage" for economic troubles in the United States after 2007, such as the Great Recession.

Results

Results by county

See also
 United States presidential elections in Kansas
 Presidency of George H. W. Bush

References

Kansas
1988
1988 Kansas elections